Allard Baird (born November 8, 1961) is an American professional baseball executive, most recently serving as the vice president and assistant general manager for scouting and player development for the New York Mets until November 6, 2020. Currently, he is an advisor for the Diamondbacks.  Baird also previously held executive positions with the Kansas City Royals and Boston Red Sox.

Early years
Baird grew up in Rochester, New Hampshire, where he played baseball for the Spaulding High School Red Raiders. He played college baseball at Southern Arkansas University (SAU) in 1985, coached at SAU in 1986, and then was the head coach at Broward Community College in 1987. Baird was inducted to the SAU hall of fame in 2012.

Career

Kansas City Royals
Baird spent 18 years in the Kansas City Royals organization, starting as the hitting coach for Class A Appleton of the Midwest League in 1988. He worked his way up the executive ladder, including serving as an assistant to the GM (1998) and assistant GM (1999–2000).

Baird replaced Herk Robinson as the Royals' general manager on June 17, 2000. Baird's job was a difficult one: taking a small-market, losing-record team and trying to compete against teams like the Cleveland Indians and Chicago White Sox.

During his six full years as general manager, Baird traded away popular players Johnny Damon, Carlos Beltrán, and Jermaine Dye with many Royal fans feeling that the team didn't get equal value. He also signed free agent Juan González to a one-year, $4 million contract, but he played only 33 games due to a back injury.

After a poor start to the 2006 season, Baird was fired on May 31 and replaced by Dayton Moore. During Baird's tenure, the team amassed a win–loss record of 381–576 (.398), including three 100-loss seasons and only one winning season (2003). The Royals did lead MLB in hits for the  season.

Boston Red Sox
Baird joined the Boston Red Sox in 2006 as an assistant to the general manager after his firing in Kansas City, and later was named vice president and director of professional scouting.
Baird later became the senior vice president of player personnel, serving under President of Baseball Operations Dave Dombrowski. The Red Sox won the World Series three times during Baird's time with the team; 2007, 2013, and 2018.

New York Mets
On November 28, 2018, Baird was hired by the New York Mets, to work for new general manager Brodie Van Wagenen.

References

1961 births
Living people
Baseball coaches
Boston Red Sox executives
Kansas City Royals executives
Kansas City Royals scouts
Major League Baseball general managers
New York Mets executives
People from Rochester, New Hampshire
Sportspeople from Strafford County, New Hampshire
Southern Arkansas Muleriders baseball players